This page covers all the important events in the sport of tennis in 2004. Primarily, it provides the results of notable tournaments throughout the year on both the ATP and WTA Tours, the Davis Cup, and the Fed Cup.

The Slams 
 2004 Australian Open
 2004 French Open
 2004 Wimbledon Championships
 2004 US Open

Notable stories

Olympics and Chile 
Held from August 15 to August 22 in Athens, Greece, it consisted of four events; men's singles, women's singles, men's doubles, and women's doubles. The standard 5th event, mixed doubles, was not part of these games. There were 170 participants (87 men and 83 women) from 52 countries. The events were held at the Athens Olympic Tennis Centre at the Athens Olympic Sports Complex. The surface was hardcourt, specifically DecoTurf, the same surface as used at the US Open in Flushing Meadow, New York. The Centre had 16 courts built specifically for the 2004 Olympics, with construction finished just before the opening of the Athens Olympics. There was a main court seating 6,000 fans for the Olympics, two show courts with seating for 3,200 seats during the Olympics, and 16 side courts with limited seating.

Chile won the most medals (three), two of which were gold, led by Nicolás Massú, who won the men's singles, and partnered by Fernando González, also helped Chile take gold in the doubles.

Russian breakthrough
The year 2004 was well known for the breakthrough of Russian players into the WTA Tour.

At the French Open, Anastasia Myskina became the first woman from Russia to win a Grand Slam singles title, by defeating compatriot Elena Dementieva in the final, 6–1, 6–2. A mere four weeks later, at Wimbledon, 17–year-old Maria Sharapova became the nation's second female Grand Slam winner, defeating two-time champion Serena Williams in the final, 6–1, 6–4, and becoming the third-youngest woman (after Lottie Dod and Martina Hingis) to win Wimbledon. Finally, at the US Open, Svetlana Kuznetsova became the nation's third consecutive winner of a Grand Slam singles title, defeating Dementieva in the final, 6–3, 7–5.

Other Russian players also made an impact on the WTA Tour that year. Nadia Petrova cracked the WTA's Top 10 for the first time, and also achieved her biggest result that year, defeating defending US Open champion Justine Henin-Hardenne in the fourth round, before losing to Kuznetsova in the quarter-finals. Vera Zvonareva also continued to improve on the Tour before injuries briefly derailed her career the following year.

The conclusion of the season culminated in Sharapova winning the 2004 WTA Tour Championships by repeating her Wimbledon victory over Serena Williams in the final, 4–6, 6–2, 6–4, after coming from 0–4 down in the final set.

ITF

Grand Slam events
{| class="wikitable" width=100%
|-
! Discipline
! 2004 Australian Open
! 2004 French Open
! 2004 Wimbledon
! 2004 US Open
|-
| Men's singles
| Roger Federerdefeated Marat Safin
| Gastón Gaudiodefeated Guillermo Coria
| Roger Federerdefeated Andy Roddick
| Roger Federerdefeated Lleyton Hewitt
|-
| Women's singles
| Justine Henin-Hardennedefeated Kim Clijsters
| Anastasia Myskinadefeated Elena Dementieva
| Maria Sharapovadefeated Serena Williams
| Svetlana Kuznetsovadefeated Elena Dementieva
|-
| Men's doubles
| Michaël Llodra / Fabrice Santorodefeated Bob Bryan / Mike Bryan
| Xavier Malisse / Olivier Rochusdefeated Michaël Llodra / Fabrice Santoro
| Jonas Björkman / Todd Woodbridgedefeated Julian Knowle / Nenad Zimonjić
| Mark Knowles / Daniel Nestordefeated Leander Paes / David Rikl
|-
| Women's doubles
| Virginia Ruano / Paola Suárez'defeated Svetlana Kuznetsova / Elena Likhovtseva
| Virginia Ruano / Paola Suárezdefeated Svetlana Kuznetsova / Elena Likhovtseva
| Cara Black / Rennae Stubbsdefeated Liezel Huber / Ai Sugiyama
| Virginia Ruano / Paola Suárezdefeated Svetlana Kuznetsova / Elena Likhovtseva
|-
| Mixed doubles
| Elena Bovina / Nenad Zimonjićdefeated Martina Navratilova / Leander Paes
| Tatiana Golovin / Richard Gasquetdefeated Cara Black / Wayne Black
| Cara Black / Wayne Blackdefeated Alicia Molik / Todd Woodbridge
| Vera Zvonareva / Bob Bryandefeated Alicia Molik / Todd Woodbridge
|}

Davis Cup

Fed Cup

Hopman Cup

ATP

Tennis Masters Cup
Houston, United States

Singles:  Roger Federer defeat  Lleyton Hewitt, 6–3 6–2
Doubles:  Bob Bryan &  Mike Bryan defeat  Wayne Black &  Kevin Ullyett, 6–7(6–8), 6–3, 7–6(7–4)

ATP Masters Series

WTA

WTA Tour Championships
Los Angeles, USA
Singles:  Maria Sharapova defeated  Serena Williams, 4–6, 6–2, 6–4
Doubles:  Nadia Petrova &  Meghann Shaughnessy defeated  Svetlana Kuznetsova &  Elena Likhovtseva, 6–3, 6–2

WTA Tier I
Toray Pan Pacific Open, Tokyo, Japan 
Singles:  Lindsay Davenport defeated  Magdalena Maleeva, 6–4, 6–1
Doubles:  Cara Black &  Rennae Stubbs defeated  Elena Likhovtseva &  Magdalena Maleeva, 6–0, 6–1.
Pacicic Life Open, Indian Wells, United States 
Singles:  Justine Henin-Hardenne defeated  Lindsay Davenport, 6–1, 6–4
Doubles:  Virginia Ruano Pascual /  Paola Suárez defeated  Svetlana Kuznetsova /  Elena Likhovtseva, 6–1 6–2
NASDAQ-100 Open, Miami, United States 
Singles:  Serena Williams defeated  Elena Dementieva, 6–1, 6–1
Doubles:  Nadia Petrova &  Meghann Shaughnessy defeated  Svetlana Kuznetsova &  Elena Likhovtseva, 6–2 6–3
Family Circle Cup, Charleston, United States
Singles:  Venus Williams defeated  Conchita Martínez, 2–6, 6–2, 6–1
Doubles:  Paola Suárez &  Virginia Ruano Pascual defeated  Lisa Raymond &  Martina Navratilova, 6–1, 6–4
Qatar Total German Open, Berlin, Germany 
Singles:  Amélie Mauresmo defeated  Venus Williams, w/o.
Doubles:  Nadia Petrova &  Meghann Shaughnessy defeated  Conchita Martínez &  Janette Husárová, 6–2, 2–6, 6–1
Telecom Italia Masters Roma, Rome, Italy
Singles:  Amélie Mauresmo defeated  Jennifer Capriati, 3–6, 6–3, 7–6(8–6).
Doubles:  Nadia Petrova &  Meghann Shaughnessy defeated  Paola Suárez &  Virginia Ruano Pascual, 6–4, 5–7, 6–2
Acura Classic, San Diego, United States
Singles:  Lindsay Davenport defeated  Anastasia Myskina, 6–1, 6–1
Doubles:  Cara Black &  Rennae Stubbs defeated  Paola Suárez &  Virginia Ruano Pascual, 4–6, 6–1, 6–4
Rogers Cup presented by American Express, Montreal, Canada
Singles:  Amélie Mauresmo defeated  Elena Likhovtseva, 6–1, 6–0
Doubles:  Shinobu Asagoe &  Ai Sugiyama defeated  Liezel Huber &  Tamarine Tanasugarn, 6–0, 6–3
Kremlin Cup, Moscow, Russia
Singles:  Anastasia Myskina defeated  Elena Dementieva, 7–5, 6–0
Doubles:  Anastasia Myskina &  Vera Zvonareva defeated  Paola Suárez &  Virginia Ruano Pascual, 6–3, 4–6, 6–2
Zurich Open, Zürich, Switzerland
Singles:  Alicia Molik defeated  Maria Sharapova, 4–6, 6–2, 6–3
Doubles:  Cara Black &  Rennae Stubbs defeated  Paola Suárez &  Virginia Ruano Pascual, 6–4, 6–4

MoviesWimbledon''

International Tennis Hall of Fame
Class of 2004:
Dorothy Cheney, player
Stefan Edberg, player
Steffi Graf, player

See also

 Tennis at the 2004 Summer Olympics

References

External links
 BBC review of Wimbledon 2004
 The Guardian US Open review 2004

 
Tennis by year